Chigutisauridae is an extinct family of large temnospondyl amphibians.  The only genera recognized as belonging to Chigutisauridae at the current time are all from Gondwana. Chigutisaurids first appeared during the Early Triassic in Australia. During the Late Triassic they became widely distributed in Gondwana, with fossils found in South Africa, India and South America. Koolasuchus from the Early Cretaceous of Australia represents the youngest known temnospondyl.

List of genera

Chigutisaurus 
Compsocerops 
Keratobrachyops (placement uncertain)
Koolasuchus
Kuttycephalus
Pelorocephalus
Siderops

References

Sengupta, D.P. 1995. Chigutisaurid temnspondyls from the Late Triassic of India and a review of the family Chigutisauridae. Palaeontology 38: 19-59.
Sengupta, D.P. 2003. Triassic temnospondyls of the Pranhita-Godavari Basin, India. Journal of Asian Earth Sciences 21: 655-662.

External links
Chigutisauridae at Palaeos.com

 
Triassic temnospondyls
Jurassic temnospondyls
Cretaceous temnospondyls
Amphibian families
Early Triassic first appearances
Early Cretaceous extinctions